130 West 30th Street, also "The Cass Gilbert", is a luxury condominium on 30th Street between the Avenue of the Americas (Sixth Avenue) and Seventh Avenue in Midtown Manhattan in New York City. The 18-story building was designed by architect Cass Gilbert as offices, showrooms and manufacturing space in New York's fur district, just south of the Garment District.

The building was originally known as the S.J.M Building, named for Salomon J. Manne, a fur trader with whom Gilbert shared a box at the Metropolitan Opera. It was renamed “The Cass Gilbert” in 2004. The building is also included in the AIA Guide to New York City.
 
Above the doorways are terra-cotta decorative friezes set in marble and based on Assyrian stone reliefs which feature hunters, horses and stylized lions. The animal motif, perhaps an acknowledgement to the fur district, can also be found in the brass elevator doors in the lobby. Additional terra-cotta friezes with winged beasts which encircle the building at various levels accentuate the modern skyscraper set backs that reflect the 1916 zoning rules to allow more light and sunlight. The doorway panels have been cited in Ephemeral New York as “triumphant” and “exotic.”

130 West 30th Street was designated as a Landmark by the New York City Landmarks Preservation Commission in 2001. The building was converted to a residential condominium in 2003, comprising 45 residential units as well as four commercial units which were later combined into one, housing Beit Simchat Torah, an LGBT synagogue, which was finished in 2016 and the NYTimes called “mystical.”

Gallery

References 

Midtown Manhattan
New York City Designated Landmarks in Manhattan
Office buildings completed in 1928
Residential buildings in Manhattan